Census Johnston (born 6 May 1981) is a former Samoan rugby union player. He has represented Samoa several times, and was in the Pacific Islanders' (combined Fiji, Samoa, Tonga) team which toured Europe in November 2006 and earned 6 Caps with English Barbarians F.C . His usual position is prop. Johnston previously played for Saracens F.C. in the English Guinness Premiership, as well as for Biarritz Olympique Stade Toulousain. Racing 92 and Aviron Bayonnais , also in the French Top 14. He also played for Taranaki in the 2006 Air New Zealand Cup. Census attended Rosebank Primary School and Waitākere College and Avondale college in Auckland before moving to Europe in 2005, winning 3x French Top 14 championships [2006 Biarritz 2011, 2012 Toulouse] and Heineken cup championship in 2010 also with Toulouse. In 2010 he was a replacement for the final as Toulouse won the Heineken Cup. In 2015 he was selected for Manu Samoa.

At the age of 36 he signed to Racing 92 for 2 seasons [2018/2019], playing a final season with Aviron Bayonnais before his retirement in 2020 aged 39.

References

External links

 
 Census Johnston on stadetoulousain.fr

1981 births
Samoan rugby union players
Living people
Rugby union props
Saracens F.C. players
Biarritz Olympique players
Stade Toulousain players
Taranaki rugby union players
Expatriate rugby union players in France
Samoa international rugby union players
Pacific Islanders rugby union players
Samoan expatriate rugby union players
Expatriate rugby union players in New Zealand
Expatriate rugby union players in England
Samoan expatriate sportspeople in New Zealand
Samoan expatriate sportspeople in France
Samoan expatriate sportspeople in England
Rugby union players from Auckland
People from Auckland
New Zealand sportspeople of Samoan descent
New Zealand expatriate sportspeople in England
New Zealand expatriate sportspeople in France